Odalheim is the 11th studio album by the Swedish death metal band Unleashed. It was released on 24 April 2012 by Nuclear Blast Records.

Track listing

Reception

Personnel
 Johnny Hedlund – vocals, bass
 Fredrik Folkare – lead guitar
 Tomas Måsgard – rhythm guitar
 Anders Schultz – drums

References

External links
  Unleashed Homepage

Unleashed (band) albums
2012 albums
Nuclear Blast albums

pl:As Yggdrasil Trembles